Ear Candy is the sixth studio album by heavy metal/hard rock trio King's X, released in 1996. Ear Candy was produced by Arnold Lanni and King's X.

The album has two songs which are rewritten versions of earlier songs: "Picture" is also known as "The Door", a song with different lyrics, released on their pre-King's X release Sneak Preview. The song "Mississippi Moon" is mainly inspired on the song "If I Could Fly", which King's X played in shows after they had changed their name to its definite version, King's X.

The bonus track "Freedom" can also be found as a b-side of the single "A Box". It was later given a proper release on the album Ogre Tones.

Track listing

Personnel
Doug Pinnick – bass, vocals
Ty Tabor – guitar, vocals
Jerry Gaskill – drums, vocals

Album notes
This would be the last studio album King's X would release on Atlantic Records.
"American Cheese (Jerry's Pianto)" is the second released song to feature Jerry Gaskill on lead vocals. The term pianto is a made-up word and is meant as a joke.
"American Cheese (Jerry's Pianto)" and "Lies in the Sand (The Ballad of...)" produced by Ty Tabor and King's X.
"A Box" features additional vocals by Glen Phillips of Toad The Wet Sprocket.
"Sometime" is not to be confused with "Sometimes", which is taken from King's X's first album Out of the Silent Planet.

Chart performance

References

King's X albums
Atlantic Records albums
1996 albums
Albums produced by Arnold Lanni